Max-Hellmuth Ostermann (11 December 1917 – 9 August 1942) was a Luftwaffe fighter ace during World War II. A flying ace or fighter ace is a military aviator credited with shooting down five or more enemy aircraft during aerial combat. He is credited with 102 enemy aircraft shot down claimed in over 300 combat missions. The majority of his victories were claimed over the Eastern Front with eight claims over the Western Front and one over Belgrade. Ostermann was of such short height that wooden blocks had to be attached to his rudder pedals for him to engage in tight turning aerial combat.

Born in Hamburg, Ostermann joined the military service of the Luftwaffe in 1937 and was trained as a pilot. After a brief period with Zerstörergeschwader 1 (ZG 1), a heavy fighter unit, he was transferred to Jagdgeschwader 54 (JG 54). He participated in the Battle of France and Britain before transferring east. He became the sixth fighter pilot in aviation history to achieve 100 aerial victories on the Eastern Front for which he was awarded Knight's Cross of the Iron Cross with Oak Leaves and Swords. He was killed in aerial combat with Soviet fighters southeast of Lake Ilmen on 9 August 1942.

Early life and career
Max-Hellmuth Ostermann was born on 11 December 1917 in Hamburg. His father was a civil servant in the justice department. Ostermann joined the Luftwaffe as a Fahnenjunker (Officer Cadet) in March 1937 after he had received his Abitur (diploma)—the final exams that pupils take at the end of their secondary education. His first assignment was with I. Gruppe (1st group) Zerstörergeschwader 1 (ZG 1) flying the Messerschmitt Bf 110 and participated in the Invasion of Poland in 1939. In January 1940 Hauptmann (Captain) Wolfgang Falck took command of I./ZG 1. Falck came to the opinion that the Bf 110 was just a little too big for Ostermann and had him transferred to the Messerschmitt Bf 109 equipped I./Jagdgeschwader 21 (JG 21) on 7 April 1940. JG 21 at the time was based at Mönchengladbach and was subordinated to Oberstleutnant (Lieutenant Colonel) Max Ibel, the Geschwaderkommodore (Wing Commander) of Jagdgeschwader 27.

He claimed his first of two aerial victories in the Battle of France on 20 May 1940. Ostermann was appointed the commander of a Rotte, an element of two aircraft, with Unteroffizier (non-commissioned officer) Fritz Marcks as his wingman. The Schwarm (flight) led by Oberleutnant (Senior Lieutenant or First Lieutenant) Günther Scholz engaged eight French Morane-Saulnier M.S.406's fighters near Amiens with Ostermann, Marcks and Scholz claiming one each. His second aerial victory was achieved over a Curtiss Hawk-75 on 26 May 1940. In a head on firing pass two 20mm shells tore off large parts of the aircraft's tail fin, which then collided with Osterrmann's starboard wing. The French pilot was observed to bail out with Ostermann managing to make a safe landing.

By the time I./JG 21 was ordered to the coastal area of the English Channel the Gruppe was redesignated III./Jagdgeschwader 54 (JG 54). Ostermann's third aerial victory on 12 August 1940 may have been over Flight Lieutenant E.B.B. Smith of No. 610 Squadron RAF, who bailed out of his Supermarine Spitfire I K9818. Smith was rescued from the Channel and hospitalized. On 8 October 1940 Ostermann claimed his 7th aerial victory of the war and 5th of the Battle of Britain. His opponent may have been the Czech Sergeant Josef František who was killed flying Hurricane Mk. I R4175 from No. 303 Polish Fighter Squadron near Sutton, west of Croydon, in the southern outskirts of London that day. The reason for his fatal crash remains unclear. Apart from Ostermann's claim, Leutnant (Second Lieutenant) Max Clerico and Feldwebel (Sergeant) Fritz Oeltjens also claimed one aircraft each at the same time and in the same vicinity. On 5 September 1940, III./JG 54's Gruppenkommandeur (group commander) failed to return from a mission and Geschwaderkommodore Hannes Trautloft temporarily appointed Oberleutnant Günther Scholz to lead the Gruppe. The leadership of 7. Staffel (7th squadron) was filled by Oberleutnant Hans-Ekkehard Bob, who became one of Ostermann's mentors. During an escort mission on 30 September 1940, Bob and Ostermann claimed one Spitfire shot down each. In return Ostermann's wingman was shot down and made a forced landing at Bexhill. He radioed his fellow pilots: "Spinat vier meldet sich ab nach Kanada—Spinach 4 reports off for Canada".

His aerial victory on 20 October 1940 over a No. 74 Squadron RAF Spitfire was his sixth—his eight overall—victory over Royal Air Force (RAF) fighters and his last during the Battle of Britain. The following day III./JG 54 was instructed to relocate. Five month later following a long combat pause, JG 54 was moved to the south-east to counter the pro-British coup d'état in Belgrade, Yugoslavia. He claimed his ninth victory over a Yugoslav Royal Air Force Messerschmitt Bf 109E-3, piloted by Karlo Štrebenk who was killed, on 6 April 1941 over Belgrade during the Balkans Campaign.

Eastern Front

On 23 June 1941, during the opening phase of Operation Barbarossa, the German invasion of the Soviet Union, Ostermann, in a free-hunting mission in the Lithuanian airspace north of Kaunas, intercepted a formation of nine Tupolev SB's and claimed two shot down in flames. Ostermann survived a belly landing following combat with more SBs in south-eastern Latvia on 26 June. On 5 July he claimed three SB-3 Soviet bombers in combat over the Velikaya River at Ostrov. He claimed his 19th and 20th aerial victory on 6 July in the same combat area. On the Eastern Front he claimed JG 54's 1,000th victory of the war on 1 August 1941. He became the eighth member of JG 54 to receive the Knight's Cross of the Iron Cross on 4 September 1941 after 29 aerial victories. The award was presented on 10 September 1941 in Dno by Generaloberst (Colonel General) Alfred Keller.

From 5 November to 5 December 1941, Ostermann temporarily led 3./JG 54 (3rd squadron), substituting for Oberleutnant Hans Schmoller-Haldy. He claimed his 50th aerial victory on 9 January 1942, the 60th on 28 January 1942 and the 70th on 19 February 1942. After this series of aerial victories Ostermann was sent on home leave. The reason for his leave was that he wanted to get married. Back home, on his way to his wedding ceremony, Ostermann was arrested and put in jail. A German police officer had assumed that Ostermann, with his childlike features, was actually a schoolboy who was playing a prank and illegally wearing a Luftwaffe uniform and military decorations. The consequences endured by the police officer for his bad judgement remain unknown.

After he received the Knight's Cross of the Iron Cross with Oak Leaves for 62 aerial victories on 12 March 1942 he was appointed Staffelkapitän (squadron leader) of the 8./JG 54 (8th squadron). His 80th and 81st aerial victory were claimed on 19 March 1942 followed by victories number 89 and 90 on 27 April 1942. Ostermann claimed his 100th aerial victory on 12 May 1942, the second JG 54 pilot—Hans Philipp was the first—and sixth overall to achieve the century, though in the same engagement his Bf 109F-4 was hit and damaged. Ostermann himself was hit in the right arm and upper thigh. Although severely wounded, he managed to return to his home airfield. Five days later, while in the hospital, he was awarded the Knight's Cross of the Iron Cross with Oak Leaves and Swords. The award was presented at the Führerhauptquartier, the "Wolf's Lair" at Rastenburg, on 28 and 29 June 1942.

Ostermann was killed in action on 9 August 1942 far behind Soviet lines east of Lake Ilmen. He and his wingman Unteroffizier Heinrich Bosin were flying at an altitude of  when they spotted a formation of nine Curtiss P-40's. Ostermann shot down the rear P-40. The two were reforming to make a second attack when they themselves were attacked from behind by a group of Soviet fighters emerging from the broken cloud cover. Ostermann's Bf 109G-2 (Werknummer 10438—factory number) was hit in the cockpit by 41 IAP's (41st Fighter Aviation Regiment) Starshiy Leytenant (First Lieutenant) Arkady Ivanovich Sukov flying a LaGG-3. The aircraft rolled over and crashed into the edge of a small wood. After Werner Mölders and Leopold Steinbatz, Ostermann was the third of 45 recipients of the Knight's Cross of the Iron Cross with Oak Leaves and Swords to die in World War II. This made him the first Swords recipient to be lost in air combat, as Mölders death was accidental and Steinbatz had only received the Oak Leaves before he died.

Summary of career

Aerial victory claims
According to US historian David T. Zabecki, Ostermann was credited with 102 aerial victories. Mathews and Foreman, authors of Luftwaffe Aces — Biographies and Victory Claims, researched the German Federal Archives and found records for 102 aerial victory claims, plus six further unconfirmed claims. This number includes eight claims on the Western Front, one in Yugoslavia, and 93 Soviet Air Forces piloted aircraft on the Eastern Front. Victory claims were logged to a map-reference (PQ = Planquadrat), for example "PQ 10481". These sectors were then subdivided into 36 smaller units to give a location area 3 × 4 km in size.

Awards
 Wound Badge in Black
 Front Flying Clasp of the Luftwaffe in Gold with Pennant "300"
 Combined Pilots-Observation Badge
 Iron Cross (1939)
 2nd Class (31 May 1940)
 1st Class (1940)
 Knight's Cross of the Iron Cross with Oak Leaves and Swords
 Knight's Cross  on 4 September 1941 as Leutnant and pilot in the 7./Jagdgeschwader 54
 81st Oak Leaves on 12 March 1942 as Oberleutnant and Staffelkapitän of the 7./Jagdgeschwader 54
 10th Swords on 17 May 1942 as Oberleutnant and Staffelkapitän of the 7./Jagdgeschwader 54

Notes

References

Citations

Bibliography

 
 
 
 
 
 
 
 
 
 
 
 
 
 
 
 
 

1917 births
1942 deaths
Military personnel from Hamburg
German World War II flying aces
Luftwaffe personnel killed in World War II
Luftwaffe pilots
Recipients of the Knight's Cross of the Iron Cross with Oak Leaves and Swords
Aviators killed by being shot down